The 2013–14 Ekstraklasa season was Lechia's 70th since their creation, and was their 6th continuous season in the top league of Polish football.

The season covers the period from 1 July 2013 to 30 June 2014.

Players

First team squad

Transfers

Players In

Out

Friendlies

Summer

Winter

Regular season

Fixtures for the 2013-14 Ekstraklasa season

League table

Championship round

Championship round fixtures

League table

Polish Cup

References

Lechia Gdańsk seasons
Polish football clubs 2013–14 season